Jungdeutsche Partei in Polen (JDP), or the Young German Party in Poland, was a Nazi German extreme right-wing political party founded in 1931 by members of the ethnic German minority residing in the Second Polish Republic.

The party was opposed not only to collaboration with Poland, but also, with other German organizations in Poland. Its leader was Rudolf Wiesner (pictured, fourth from the left), a committed Nazi. He was replaced by Max Wambeck from NSDAP on 22 November 1938. After the invasion of Poland Wambeck (fluent in Polish, known as Maksymilian Wambeck locally) served as SS-Obersturmführer in  Chodzież in the Gnesen Gau (Polish Gniezno County) interrogating and torturing Armia Krajowa resistance members.

Activities
Sponsored financially by the Ministry of Foreign Affairs of Nazi Germany, the Jungdeutsche Partei members trained in propaganda, sabotage and espionage activities against the Polish state, smuggled military weapons, and waged a campaign of intimidating other members of the community to leave for Nazi Germany, with tangible incentives. A considerable number of young Polish Germans joined the rank-and-file of the Party during the mid-1930s as a result of Nazi indoctrination and aggressive recruitment. The party had its own flag with JdP symbol in it, celebrated anniversaries (Heldengedenktag), a hymn sung at gatherings (Jungdeutsche marschiert) with a Nazi salute, and its own red armbands similar to NSDAP.

The Jungdeutsche Partei was formed originally in 1921 in Bielsko-Biała as the Deutscher Nationalsozialistischer Verein in Polen. Renamed in 1931 the party gradually expanded its activities to cover most of Upper Silesia with 1,200 members, and other regions such as Greater Poland (since 1934) as well as Pomerania and Volhynia in the following years. The public rallies held by the party were aggressively anti-Polish, rabidly racist, and anti-Jewish; while proclaiming to the world: "We want to be Germans, and nothing but Germans."  JDP was dissolved by Adolf Hitler after the invasion of Poland with transfer of its membership to Germany.

See also
 Deutscher Volksverband, the German People's Union in interwar Poland
 Deutsche Vereinigung,  the German minority organization from northern Poland
 Sonderdienst, Nazi German paramilitary formations created after the invasion

Notes and references

1931 establishments in Poland
Defunct political parties in Poland
Far-right political parties in Poland
German nationalist political parties
Invasion of Poland
Germany–Poland relations
Nationalist parties in Poland
Nazi parties
Poland in World War II
Political parties established in 1931
Political parties with year of disestablishment missing
German political parties in Poland
Polish Nazis